Division No. 11 is a census division in Alberta, Canada. Surrounding the City of Edmonton, the majority of the division comprises Alberta's Capital Region, while the western and southern portions of the division are located within central Alberta. The division also forms the northern segment of the Calgary–Edmonton Corridor.

Census subdivisions 
The following census subdivisions (municipalities or municipal equivalents) are located within Alberta's Division No. 11.

Cities
Edmonton
Beaumont
Fort Saskatchewan
Leduc
Spruce Grove
St. Albert
Wetaskiwin
Towns
Bon Accord
Calmar
Devon
Drayton Valley
Gibbons
Legal
Millet
Morinville
Redwater
Stony Plain
Thorsby
Villages
Breton
Spring Lake
Wabamun
Warburg
Summer villages
Argentia Beach
Betula Beach
Crystal Springs
Golden Days
Grandview
Itaska Beach
Kapasiwin
Lakeview
Ma-Me-O Beach
Norris Beach
Point Alison
Poplar Bay
Seba Beach
Silver Beach
Sundance Beach
Specialized municipalities
Strathcona County
Urban service areas
Sherwood Park
Municipal districts
Brazeau County
Leduc County
Parkland County
Sturgeon County
Wetaskiwin No. 10, County of
Indian reserves
Alexander 134
Enoch Cree Nation 135
Ermineskin 138
Louis Bull 138B
Pigeon Lake 138A
Wabamun 133A
Wabamun 133B

Demographics 

See also 
List of census divisions of Alberta
List of communities in Alberta

References 

Census divisions of Alberta
Edmonton